British Muslim TV is a UK-based, free-to-air, English language, Islamic-focused satellite television channel funded by commercial advertising.

Premise
British Muslim TV was conceptualised towards the end of 2013 and underwent planning from the start of 2014. The channel is independently owned by Mr Arshad Ashraf and is funded solely by commercial advertising. Prominent advertisers include British Muslim Charities Read Foundation and Penny Appeal.

Content
In June 2014, British Muslim TV was launched on the Sky Digital platform. It states, "A new Sky channel that provides both Muslim and non-Muslim communities with news, views and insights into how British Muslims live. We will also present content from our community, for our community, with the aim to make British Muslims feel confidently Muslim and comfortably British." The channel added, "Viewers will be treated to a range of engaging, entertaining and educational content, aimed at showcasing the best that our British Muslim community has to offer." The programme content has been exclusively funded and made in the UK.

The other shows broadcast include Marriage Made in Britain, Talking Booth, Halal Kitchen, British Muslim Teen Vision and Women Like Us, a female-led panel show covering a range of issues relating to British Muslim women.

Growth
In 2016, the channel commissioned the production of British romantic comedy film Finding Fatimah, which was released in UK cinemas in April 2017.

In February 2020, Joseph Hayat was announced as the new editor-in-chief of the channel.

Awards
In January 2015, British Muslim TV won the Responsible Media of the Year award at the British Muslim Awards.

See also
List of Islamic television and radio stations in the United Kingdom
List of free-to-air channels at 28°E

References

External links

British Muslim TV on TV Guide*British Muslim TV teaser trailer

Television channels and stations established in 2014
2014 establishments in the United Kingdom
Television channels in the United Kingdom
Islamic television networks
Companies based in Wakefield
Islam in the United Kingdom